Bitsa Equestrian club (in Russian-Битца) is the largest European equestrian sports center. It is situated in Moscow, Russia, Balaclava Prospect d.33.

History
Its construction began in 1977 before the XXII Moscow Olympic Games. July 4, 1980 is the official opening of the complex. Bitsa Equestrian club is more than 45 hectares - including the Bitsa forest park. During the 1980 Summer Olympics, it hosted the riding and running portions of the modern pentathlon events and all of the equestrian events except individual jumping.

External links
 http://www.kskbitsa.ru
 :ru:Битца (конноспортивный комплекс)

Sports venues in Moscow
Equestrian venues